Wolfgang Rindler (18 May 1924 – 8 February 2019) was a physicist working in the field of general relativity where he is known for introducing the term "event horizon", Rindler coordinates, and (in collaboration with Roger Penrose) for the use of spinors in general relativity.

Life and career
Born in Vienna on 18 May 1924, Wolfgang Rindler was the son of a lawyer. In 1938, his mother sent him to England through the auspices of the Kindertransport rescue of Jewish children from Germany and Austria. He gained his B.Sc. and M.Sc. from the University of Liverpool and his PhD from Imperial College London. From 1956 to 1963 he taught at Cornell University.

In 1960 Oliver & Boyd and InterScience published his first book on special relativity. Reviewer Alfred Schild said it was an "excellent, clear and concise account" and "provided a sound balance between physical ideas, analytical formulae and space-time geometry". (1966, second edition)

In 1961 Rindler used the Fitzgerald contraction as the premise of his article "Length contraction paradox". The thought experiment is now called the ladder paradox.

In September 1963 he took up a position at the newly founded Southwest Center for Advanced Studies, the private research organization that in 1969 became the University of Texas at Dallas, where he was one of the founding faculty members. He was based at UTD for the remainder of his career, eventually becoming professor emeritus. He was visiting scholar at King's College London for the academic year 1961–1962, at the University La Sapienza in Rome for 1968–1969,

In 1969 Springer published the first edition of his Essential Relativity: Special, General, and Cosmological. The undergraduate textbook was lauded as a "refreshingly modern approach to the critical problem of teaching relativity theory." Another reviewer said it is "simply the best introduction" and is "filled with fabulous insights." When the second edition appeared in 1977 a reviewer noted its treatment "reminiscent of Mach's celebrated examination of the foundations of classical mechanics". On the other hand, the second edition "gives the barest hints of new developments" (models of neutron stars, in X-ray astronomy, supernova explosions, and quasars). Later, another reviewer criticized it for the paucity of diagrams, but lauded the chapter on cosmology as "lyrical, philosophical, yet technical."

Rindler was a visiting scholar at the University of Vienna in 1975 and 1987, and at Churchill College, Cambridge University, in 1990.

In 1982 Oxford University Press published Introduction to Special Relativity, with the second edition in 1991. A reviewer noted that other books provide a better introduction and intuitive understanding, but that it "should provide a useful reference for most applications of special relativity: kinematics, optics, particle mechanics, electromagnetism and mechanics of continua."

In 1984 Roger Penrose and Rindler published Spinors and Spacetime, volume 1, on "two-spinor calculus and relativistic fields". Michał Heller wrote that Spinors and Spacetime "is both elementary and highly advanced. It begins on an almost graduate level but soon, step by step, reaches the highest standards of modern mathematical physics."

In 2001 Oxford University Press published Relativity: Special, General and Cosmological, with a second edition in 2006. A reviewer noted "His writing is elegant, yet compact and logically precise." He was impressed with the "discussion of the internal structure of black holes analyzed first in Schwarzschild coordinates, and then in a masterful treatment of the Kruskal extension."

Wolfgang Rindler died at the age of 94 on 8 February 2019.

Articles
Rindler published several articles in The American Journal of Physics (AJP):

References

 W. Rindler & Roger Penrose (1988). Spinors and Space-Time: Volume 2, Spinor and Twistor Methods in Space-Time Geometry  (paperback)

External links
 Rindler's Homepage

1924 births
2019 deaths
Alumni of the University of Liverpool
Alumni of Imperial College London
Austrian Jews
British Jews
British people of Austrian-Jewish descent
Jewish physicists
Members of the Austrian Academy of Sciences
British relativity theorists
University of Texas at Dallas faculty
Textbook writers